The Aviation Products Star Trike is a German ultralight trike that was designed by Klaus Wisch and is produced by Aviation Products Ltd of Bitburg.

Design and development
The Star Trike was designed in 1980 has been in production ever since. It fits the Fédération Aéronautique Internationale microlight category. The design features a cable-braced hang glider-style high-wing, weight-shift controls, a single-seat or a two-seats-in-tandem open cockpit, tricycle landing gear with wheel pants and a single engine in pusher configuration.

The aircraft is made from bolted-together aluminum tubing, with its single or double surface wing covered in Dacron sailcloth. Its  span wing is supported by a single tube-type kingpost and uses an "A" frame weight-shift control bar. A range of powerplants can be fitted, including the twin cylinder, liquid-cooled, two-stroke, dual-ignition  Rotax 582 engine and the twin cylinder, air-cooled, four-stroke, dual-ignition  HKS 700E engine.

A number of different wings can be fitted to the basic carriage, including the Air Creation XP 15.

Variants
Star Trike Agrar
Single seat agricultural aircraft version.
Star Trike DS
Dual seat version.

Specifications (Star Trike Agrar)

References

External links

1980s German sport aircraft
1980s German ultralight aircraft
Homebuilt aircraft
Single-engined pusher aircraft
Ultralight trikes